Zhang Lanxin (born 21 June 1986) is a Chinese actress.  She is noted for her role as Bonnie in the film CZ12.

Biography
Zhang Lanxin was born and raised in Beijing. Lanxin graduated from Beijing Sport University. Lanxin was serving in the China National Taekwondo Team before she entered the entertainment industry. In 2004, she was the champion in the National Taekwondo Championships (55 kilograms).

In 2012, Lanxin made her film debut in CZ12, a Hong Kong-Chinese action film co-produced, written, directed by, and starring Jackie Chan. Lanxin won the Best New Performer at the 9th Huading Awards, and was nominated for the Best New Performer Award at the Beijing College Student Film Festival and the 32nd Hong Kong Film Awards. At the same year, she won the Most Potential Movie Actress Award at the LeTV Awards and the Best New Performer Award at the MSN Fashion Party Awards. Lanxin was cast in Police Story 2013, a Chinese-Hong Kong action crime film directed and written by Ding Sheng, and starring Jackie Chan.

In 2014, Lanxin starred in a romantic comedy film called Who Moved My Dream with Leon Jay Williams and Viona Wang Xi-Yao.

Filmography

Film

Television

Awards and nominations

References

External links

1986 births
Living people
Chinese television actresses
Chinese film actresses
Beijing Sport University alumni
Actresses from Beijing
21st-century Chinese actresses